Puerto Rico Highway 760 (PR-760) is a rural road located in Maunabo, Puerto Rico. It begins at its intersection with PR-3 near downtown Maunabo and ends at Punta Tuna Light.

Major intersections

Related route

Puerto Rico Highway 7760 (PR-7760) is a spur route located in Maunabo. It extends from PR-760, near Punta Tuna Light, to PR-901 in Emajagua barrio.

See also

 List of highways numbered 760

References

External links
 

760
Maunabo, Puerto Rico